Anthony J. Armentano (June 21, 1916 – December 25, 1987) was an American politician who was the 95th lieutenant governor of Connecticut from 1961 to 1963.

Early life
Anthony J. Armentano was born in Hartford, son of Joseph and Rosina (Donato) Armentano. He went to Hartford Public High School, then studied at Boston University, where he got a B.A. in business administration in 1939. Then he studied at the Boston University School of Law and received his law degree in 1941. He was admitted to the Connecticut Bar the same year. He served in the U.S. Army during the Second World War, reaching the rank of Captain before he was discharged. He started to practice law in 1946. In 1953, he became a judge of the Court of Common Pleas.

Political career
Armentano was elected to the Connecticut State Senate in 1957. He was president pro tempore from 1959. As such, he became the new Lieutenant Governor of Connecticut when the lieutenant governor John N. Dempsey succeeded governor Abraham A. Ribicoff as governor. However, he resigned as lieutenant governor in 1963.

Justice
Armentano was appointed judge of the Superior Court in 1965. He became a justice of the Supreme Court of Connecticut on March 2, 1981. In January 1983, he became a senior associate justice.

He died December 25, 1987.

See also
List of governors of Connecticut

References

1916 births
1987 deaths
Lieutenant Governors of Connecticut
Justices of the Connecticut Supreme Court
Presidents pro tempore of the Connecticut Senate
20th-century American judges
United States Army personnel of World War II
United States Army officers
20th-century American politicians